Silver Jubilee is a compilation album by the Sex Pistols released in 2002. The album brings together eight demo recordings with four live tracks.

Track listing
God Save the Queen
Anarchy in the UK
Pretty Vacant
Problems
Seventeen 
EMI
Liar
Submission
I Wanna Be Me (Live)
No Feelings (Live)
No Fun (Live)
I'm a Lazy Sod (Live)

Sex Pistols compilation albums
2002 compilation albums